North Skelton Mine was an ironstone mine in the village of North Skelton in North Yorkshire, England. The mine was the deepest of the ironstone mines in Cleveland and was also the last to close, which came in January 1964. Some buildings still exist on the surface as well as spoil heaps.

Due to the mine being developed further north, the name of North Skelton Mine stuck, even when it was moved south east of Skelton village.

History
During the rush to extract iron for the smelters of Middlesbrough, North Skelton was developed in 1865. Land was leased from Squire Wharton, the owner of Skelton Castle. Originally the site was developed nearer to the settlement of Marske, but as a greater density of ironstone was found elsewhere, the shaft was sunk further south, but the original name of North Skelton stuck, which is why the mine site lies to the south east of the village of Skelton. Additionally, the means to transport the ironstone out of the mine rested upon the North Eastern Railway providing a rail link to the mine site.

As the site of the mineshaft was remote from the nearest villages, a new settlement was created (North Skelton). The company (Bolckow, Vaughan & Co), built 236 houses at a cost of £80 each in 1871.

In 1880, production at the mine reached , but later in the decade, the ironstone mines across Cleveland suffered a drop in productivity which was connected with a downturn in the iron and steel markets. At North Skelton, some miners left Cleveland to go and work in mines in America.

From 1954, iron was also sourced underground from the remnants of the Lumpsey Mine, but was brought to the surface at North Skelton.

Records show that in 1910, North Skelton was forwarding four full freight trains per day to the smelters on south Teesside. In 1929, the assets of Bolckow, Vaughan and Co, were acquired by Dorman, Long & Co. The second owners held the mine until January 1964, when it was closed. After closure, the site was used for various above-ground industrial concerns.

Between 1876 and 1949, 36 men died in the mine through various accidents such as crushing injuries, roof falls, explosions and limbs being removed by passing trains. There were even recorded instances of boys dying after they had trespassed on the site.

Notes

References

Sources

External links

Film - The End of and Era - hosted on Yorkshire Film Archive
PDF showing North Skelton Mine in the ironstone region of Cleveland at NZ670180

Mines in North Yorkshire
Underground mines in England
Mining in North Yorkshire
Redcar and Cleveland
Ironstone Mines in North Yorkshire